The term Macedonian culture may refer to:

 Culture of Ancient Macedonians
 Culture of Macedonians (ethnic group)

In territorial terms:
 Culture of Macedonia (region)
 Culture of Ancient Macedonia
 Culture of Macedonia (Greece)
 Culture of North Macedonia
 Culture of Pirin Macedonia (Bulgaria)

See also 
 Culture of Macedonia (disambiguation)
 Macedonian art (disambiguation)
 Religion in Macedonia (disambiguation)
 Christianity in Macedonia (disambiguation)
 Macedonia (disambiguation)
 Macedonian (disambiguation)